Francesco Bernardino Ferrari was an Italian archaeologist, one of the first and most distinguished scholars of the Collegio Ambrosiano founded by Cardinal Federico Borromeo.

Biography 

Born in Milan in 1576, he entered the Congregation of the Oblates of Saints Ambrose and Charles. He studied philosophy and divinity, as well as the Latin and Greek languages, and was admitted as a doctor to the Ambrosian college. Federico Borromeo, archbishop of Milan, appointed him to travel into various parts of Europe to purchase the best books and manuscripts to form a library in Milan. Ferrari passed over part of Italy and Spain, and collected a great number of books, which laid the foundation of the famous Ambrosiana Library. About 1638 he was appointed director of the College of the Nobles, lately erected at Padua, which office he discharged two years, and then, on account of indisposition, returned to Milan. He died in Milan on February 3, 1669.

Works 

 De Antiquo Eccles. Epistolarum Genere libri tres (Milan, 1613);
 De Ritu Sacrarum Ecclesiae Catholicae concionum libri tres (Milan, 1620; Utrecht, 1692, cum praefatione Joannis Georgii Graevii);
 De Veterum acclamationibus et plausu libri septem (Milan, 1627; also in vol. VI of Graevius's Thesaur. Antiq. Rom.).

His writings are full of learning; he is very judicious in his conjectures and exact in his quotations.

Notes

References 

 
 

1576 births
1669 deaths
Italian archaeologists